MiniMetro is a family of cable propelled automated people mover systems built by HTI Group.  The vehicles either run on rails or an air cushion and have either a detachable grip (to the cable) or a fixed grip. Leitner has a test track for the vehicles in Vipiteno. The current maximum capacity of the system is around 8,000 passengers per hour. The latest system installed with the MiniMetro brand was the  Miami International Airport eTrain in 2016.

Perugia People Mover
In Perugia, a  stretch with seven stations opened in February 2008 to relieve the inner city of car traffic. The interval between successive vehicles is around 1.5 minutes. In 2013, the system carried 10,000 passengers per day. Plans exist for a second line.

Similar systems are under consideration in Bolzano and Copenhagen.

Other MiniMetro installations
 SATUOeiras in Oeiras (Portugal). Its operations were ceased in 2015
 Squaire Metro links a car park with The Squaire groundscraper, next to the Frankfurt Airport
 ExpressTram at Detroit Metropolitan Wayne County Airport
 Cairo International Airport MiniMetro people mover
 MIA e Train at Miami International Airport — a MiniMetro people mover to satellite Concourse E, replaces 1980s APM (2016)
 Pisa International Airport is connected to the Pisa Centrale — the Pisa's main railway station by Pisamover — yet another people mover under the MiniMetro trade mark.

See also

 Cable car (also known as cable tram)
 Cable Liner — a competing system from DCC Doppelmayr with mostly larger vehicles
 Former Poma 2000 in Laon, France — dismantled in 2016
 Minneapolis–St. Paul Airport Trams
 Morgantown Personal Rapid Transit
 Otis Hovair transit systems, for example, Skymetro at Zurich International Airport
 SK people mover — a similar system with smaller vehicles

References

External links

 
 Perugia Minimetrò

People movers
Cable car railways in Italy
Transport in Umbria
Perugia